WKCH (106.5 FM, "Kicks 106.5") is a radio station broadcasting a country music format. Licensed to Whitewater, Wisconsin, United States, the station serves Whitewater, Fort Atkinson and surrounding communities. In addition to country, WKCH also broadcasts local area high school sports and NASCAR. WKCH had previously broadcast UW-Whitewater Warhawks athletics, but ended that agreement following the 2021-2022 academic year. WKCH's studios are located in Fort Atkinson, alongside sister stations WFAW and WSJY.

The station is currently owned by Magnum Media, through licensee Magnum Communications, Inc.

History
The station was assigned the call letters WRLM on May 28, 1993. On September 1, 1993, the station changed its call sign to WISQ. Then, on June 14, 1996, its call letters were changed to WKCH.

In the 1990s, the station simulcasted sister station WFAW until 1999 when it began running oldies music without imaging. It finally became "Kool FM K-106" by the end of 1999 then later reimaged to its current moniker "KOOL 106.5". On March 3, 2016, WKCH shifted its format from oldies to classic hits.

On November 9, 2020, WKCH changed their format from classic hits to country, branded as Kicks 106.5".

Previous logo

References

External links

KCH
Country radio stations in the United States